American singer Sky Ferreira has recorded songs for one studio album, three extended plays, and non-album singles. She signed a recording contract with Parlophone in 2009, and released the song "One" through the label in 2010. It was written by Ferreira, Bloodshy & Avant, Magnus Lidehäll, and Marit Bergman, and peaked at number 64 on the UK Singles Chart. It was followed by "Obsession" later that year, which was written by Ferreira, Jerrod Bettis, Justin Franks, and Ryan Tedder. It reached number 37 on the U.S. Billboard Hot Dance Club Songs chart. During this time, much of her lyrical content incorporated themes of rebellion and teenage romance.

Ferreira released her first extended play As If in 2011, for which she co-wrote "Sex Rules" and "99 Tears" with Greg Kurstin and "Haters Anonymous" and "108" with Bloodshy & Avant. Her second extended play Ghost was released in 2012 by Capitol Records; it substituted the synthpop styles displayed in her earlier projects, and instead showcased more prominent elements of acoustic, new wave, and rock music. Its second single "Everything Is Embarrassing" was written by Ferreira, Dev Hynes, and Ariel Rechtshaid, and has sold 19,000 copies in the United States as of March 2014.

Ferreira released her debut studio album Night Time, My Time in 2013; it was largely inspired in indie rock musical styles. The record debuted at number 45 on the U.S. Billboard 200, becoming her first entry on the chart. Ariel Rechtshaid and Justin Louis "J.L." Raisen helped to co-write each of its twelve tracks. Her third extended play Night Time, My Time: B-Sides Part 1 was released roughly one month later, and featured additional writing contributions from Rechitshaid. That year, she additionally appeared as a featured vocalist on the track "Black" by South Korean recording artist G-Dragon for his second studio album Coup d'Etat; he co-wrote the song with Teddy Park.

Recorded songs

References

Ferreira
Sky Ferreira songs